Ålcom is a local provider of 2G GSM, 3G UMTS and 4G LTE mobile; fixed telephony, broadband, ISP services and IPTV in the autonomous Finnish region of Åland. Ålcom mobile subscribers also have full access to Elisa's mobile network when on domestic roaming in mainland Finland. Ålcom is also a full member of the Finnet (fi) group of telephone cooperatives.

In 2016, Ålcom partnered with Ukko Mobile to extend Ukko Mobile's LTE 450MHz coverage also in Åland. At the same time, Ålcom took a minority stake in Ukko Mobile.

References

Internet service providers of Finland
Mobile phone companies of Finland